The 1994 FIBA World Championship for Women was held in Australia. The list includes the twelve-women rosters of the sixteen participating countries, totaling 172 players.

Group A









Group B









Group C









Group D









References
1994 World Championship for Women at fiba.com

squads
FIBA Women's Basketball World Cup squads